Colla di Boasi is a location in the mountains surrounding Genoa, Italy, at an altitude of 651 meters above sea level.

History
In ancient times the Colla di Boasi lay on the Via Salaria, one of the seven ancient paths which probably existed since Roman times, connecting the east of Genoa with the Po Valley. On this route, goods and food were transported by mule between Genoa and Piacenza. From the 1,597 meter Monte Antola, the route begins to descend rapidly towards the sea. After the Colletto pass, the winding mule track of large stones reaches the village of Donetta. After this village, the path goes through Torriglia, which was connected with Genoa via the Scoffera passage. In ancient times, before the tunnel was built, only the mountain path through Colla di Boasi connected with the main city of Liguria.
 
The first historical mention of Colla di Boasi is linked to a battle that took place on 1 May 1747, when the army of the Republic of Genoa was attacked by the army of the Örgerzog of Austria on Mount Lavanjola. Repulsing the attacks, the Genoans were forced to relocate to Colla di Boasi, where an army of 1,000 soldiers led by Pier Maria Canevari came to their aid. After this, the army of the Genoese Republic managed to defeat the Austrians.

The second mention of Colla di Boasi is from 5 March 1800, when 2,500 French soldiers coming from Torriglia divided into three columns: one across the Scoffera and Boasi, the other along the slopes of the Colla di Boasi, and entered the Fontanabuona valley on the orders of General André Masséna to suppress the uprising there and the riots in the Ligurian Republic.

In 1898, Signor Genserico Benvenuto began the construction of a small castle at the location, "Colla di Boasi", completed in 1905. 

During the Second World War, the owners of the castle emigrated to Argentina, abandoning their property in Italy. In the second half of the 20th century, the castle was used for various kinds of institutions, but by the beginning of the 21st century, the castle and all adjacent buildings had fallen into poor condition and some were destroyed. As of 2015, Colla di Boasi is under private ownership and restoration work is taking place on the castle.

Wildlife
In the first half of the 20th century, Colla di Boasi hosted one of two state-licensed points for tracking migratory and nesting birds in Liguria. Under the direction of Genserico Benvenuto, much work was done to catch and ring the various species of birds that nest in Liguria, including Carduelis cannabina (linnet), Emberiza melanocephala (black-headed bunting), Accipitrinae (hawks), Carduelis spinus (Eurasian siskin), and Anthus trivialis (tree pipit). For this purposes, Benvenuto was preparing the premises in Colla di Boasi for the short-term containment of birds. Between 1931 and 1935, 708 different bird species were recorded in the Colla di Boasi.

References

Castles in Liguria
Castles in Italy